Nodozana xanthomela is a moth of the subfamily Arctiinae. It was described by Herbert Druce in 1899. It is found in the Amazon region.

References

Lithosiini
Moths described in 1899